Aleksei Nikolayevich Triputen (born 6 July 1982) is a Russian retired professional footballer.

Club career
He made his professional debut in the Russian Premier League in 2001 for FC Torpedo-ZIL Moscow.

After retirement, he works as a radio commentator.

Honours
 Russian Premier League runner-up: 2002.
 Russian Cup winner: 2002.

References

1982 births
People from Odintsovsky District
Living people
Russian footballers
Russia under-21 international footballers
Association football midfielders
FC Moscow players
Russian Premier League players
PFC CSKA Moscow players
FC Sokol Saratov players
Sportspeople from Moscow Oblast